The Kapowai River is a river in the Waikato region of New Zealand. It is located on the Coromandel Peninsula, and flows north from its source inland from Tairua, reaching the sea at Whitianga Harbour

See also
List of rivers of New Zealand

References

Thames-Coromandel District
Rivers of Waikato
Rivers of New Zealand